Mahmoud Attia (born 12 August 1981) is an Egyptian Paralympic powerlifter. He won silver in the Men's 72 kg in 2020.

References

External links
 
 

1981 births
Living people
Egyptian male weightlifters
Paralympic powerlifters of Egypt
Paralympic silver medalists for Egypt
Paralympic medalists in powerlifting
Powerlifters at the 2020 Summer Paralympics
Medalists at the 2020 Summer Paralympics
21st-century Egyptian people